Thalisson Kelven da Silva (born 7 May 1998), is a Brazilian professional footballer who plays as a centre back for Juventude, on loan from Mirassol.

Career
Thalisson started his career in Coritiba's youth system. His professional debut came on July 16, 2017 against Fluminense in the Brasileirão. On August 3, 2017 he made his first start against São Paulo.

References

External links

1998 births
Living people
Brazilian footballers
People from Ji-Paraná
Association football central defenders
Campeonato Brasileiro Série A players
Campeonato Brasileiro Série B players
Coritiba Foot Ball Club players
Clube de Regatas Brasil players
Associação Atlética Internacional (Limeira) players
Mirassol Futebol Clube players
Esporte Clube Juventude players
Sportspeople from Rondônia